Mira is an album by bassist and composer Arild Andersen recorded in late 2012 and released on the ECM label in early 2014. It is the trio's second recording following the 2008 release Live at Belleville.

Reception

The AllMusic review by Thom Jurek states "On Mira, this trio's musical language has evolved to express a different dialect, one full of inquiry, intelligence, and soul". The Guardians John Fordham said "It's a more muted set than 2007's Live at Belleville, and softer than the band sounds in concert, but there's plenty of contrast....the sheer depth and lustre of this trio's sound can invite you to start purring in grateful imitation". All About Jazz reviewer John Kelmann said, "Contrasting the greater energy of Live at Belleville, the studio-born Mira may find Andersen, Smith and Vinaccia in a generally more pensive mood, but that doesn't mean there aren't moments where the trio simmers with collective heat....A long overdue and equally impressive follow-up—albeit for different reasons—Mira presents this trio in a different light to its 2008 debut; still, it's no surprise that Andersen, Vinaccia and Smith prove as capable of darker intents as they do more energetic exchanges".

Track listing
All compositions by Arild Andersen except where noted.
 "Bygone" - 6:37
 "Blussy" - 6:01
 "Alfie" (Burt Bacharach, Hal David) - 7:06
 "Rossetti" - 5:37
 "Reparate" - 8:34
 "Raijin" (Tommy Smith, Paolo Vinaccia) - 3:11
 "Le Saleya" - 5:21
 "Kangiten" - 1:38
 "Mira" - 7:06
 "Eight and More" - 6:05
 "Stevtone" (Arild Andersen, Kirsten Bråten Berg) - 5:33

Personnel
 Arild Andersen - bass
 Tommy Smith - tenor saxophone, shakuhachi
 Paolo Vinaccia - drums

References

2014 albums
Arild Andersen albums
ECM Records albums
Albums produced by Manfred Eicher